National Secondary Route 107, or just Route 107 (or ) is a National Road Route of Costa Rica, located in the Alajuela province.

Description
In Alajuela province the route covers Alajuela canton (Sabanilla, Tambor districts), Grecia canton (Grecia, San Isidro, San José districts), Poás canton (San Pedro, San Juan, San Rafael districts).

References

Highways in Costa Rica